Kari Dazan (also Romanized as Karī Dāzān; also known as Kowrīderāzun) is a village in Rahdar Rural District, in the Central District of Rudan County, Hormozgan Province, Iran. At the 2006 census, its population was 23, in 4 families.

References 

Populated places in Rudan County